Rashkan-e Sofla (also Romanized as Rashkān-e Soflá; also known as Rashkān) is a village in Alan Rural District, in the Central District of Sardasht County, West Azerbaijan Province, Iran. At the 2006 census, its population was 24, in 7 families.

References 

Populated places in Sardasht County